The Botswana Hockey Association is the governing body of field hockey in Botswana. It is affiliated to IHF International Hockey Federation and AHF African Hockey Federation. The headquarter of the association is in Gaborone, Botswana.

Ms. Unaswi Matebu is the President of the association and Ms. Dear Ramajalwa is her deputy. Mr. Vaughan Strugnell handles the post of the Secretary.

History

See also
African Hockey Federation

References

External links
Official Website
Botswana-FIH
Botswana Hockey-FB

Botswana
Hockey